Roberto Joaquín Martínez Vera-Tudela (born December 3, 1967 in Lima) is a Peruvian football manager and former player. He is one of the top representative players of Universitario de Deportes from the late 1980s and mid 1990s.

Career
He won national titles both with Universitario de Deportes and Deportivo San Agustin in conjunction to his good friend and player José del Solar. Martínez made 24 appearances for the Peru national football team from 1986 to 1993.

References

External links

1967 births
Living people
Footballers from Lima
Association football midfielders
Peruvian footballers
1987 Copa América players
1991 Copa América players
1993 Copa América players
Peru international footballers
Peruvian Primera División players
Club Universitario de Deportes footballers
Sport Boys footballers
Deportivo Municipal footballers
Peruvian football managers